The iPad 10.9-inch (officially iPad (10th generation), unofficially known as the iPad 10) is a tablet computer developed and marketed by Apple Inc. as the successor to the ninth-generation iPad. It was announced on October 18, 2022, and was released on October 26, 2022.

Design 
The tenth-generation iPad is available in four colors: Silver, Pink, Blue, and Yellow. It is the first lower-end iPad without a Home button. The tenth-generation iPad is redesigned over the ninth-generation iPad, more closely resembling the configuration of the iPad Air. The device features a design with flatter edges to match the higher-end iPads of the time. The home button is removed, with Touch ID instead contained in the power button, like in the iPad Air and iPad mini.

Features

Hardware 
The tenth-generation iPad uses an A14 Bionic system on a chip, previously seen in the fourth-generation iPad Air and the iPhone 12 in 2020. The chip has a 6-core CPU, a 4-core GPU, and a 16-core Neural Engine. 

Like the iPad Air, it has a 10.9-inch 2360 by 1640 Liquid Retina display with 3.8 million pixels. The display has True Tone and 500 nits of brightness.

The tenth-generation iPad features an upgraded rear 12-megapixel Wide camera, the first ever in a lower-end iPad, with an ƒ/1.8 aperture, Smart HDR 3, and 4K video recording support. The front-facing camera is now located on the right-hand side of the display, instead of at the top, a first for any iPad. The Landscape 12-megapixel Ultra Wide camera supports Center Stage, like the previous generation.

Connectivity 
The tenth-generation iPad charges and connects using a USB-C port rather than the Lightning port of the ninth-generation iPad. All models have Bluetooth 5.2 and Wi-Fi 6 (802.11ax) wireless capabilities. Cellular models support sub-6 GHz 5G with peak speeds of up to 3.5 gigabits/second in ideal conditions.

Accessories 
Unlike the iPad mini and iPad Air, the tenth-generation iPad does not support pairing with or charging the second-generation Apple Pencil. The first-generation Apple Pencil is still supported but requires an adapter to pair and charge. This adapter was included in the box of the first-generation Apple Pencil shortly after the release of the tenth-generation iPad.

The tenth-generation iPad introduces Magic Keyboard Folio, as it is incompatible with the existing Magic Keyboard and Smart Keyboard Folio. The Magic Keyboard Folio, like the Magic Keyboard for iPad, has a built-in trackpad with front and back protection. However, unlike the Magic Keyboard designed for the iPad Air and iPad Pro, the Magic Keyboard Folio detaches from the back cover and can be used as an adjustable stand, and it includes a 14-key function row with a Lock button, similar to the Magic Keyboard for the 2021 iMac.

Reception 

The tenth-generation iPad received mixed responses from critics. The iPad was criticized for the removal of the headphone jack, a higher price point than its predecessor, and the lack of support of the 2nd-generation Apple Pencil. Critics praised the iPad for its new design, battery life, and fast performance. 

MacStories says it gives "mixed signals". CNET called it "superb", but that "most people can skip" it.

Timeline

Notes

References

External links 

Official tech specs website

IPad
iPad
Tablet computers
Touchscreen portable media players
Tablet computers introduced in 2022